"Step" is a song by American indie rock band Vampire Weekend. Written and composed by band members Ezra Koenig and Rostam Batmanglij and produced by Ariel Rechtshaid and Batmanglij, the song was released as the fourth and final single from the band's third studio album Modern Vampires of the City. The song was inspired by American hip hop group Souls of Mischief's song "Step to My Girl".

Composition
The lyrics and other elements of "Step" were inspired by the song "Step to My Girl" which was recorded as a demo by the Oakland-based hip-hop group Souls of Mischief. The hip-hop group was contacted by Vampire Weekend's legal team to sample and use one of the lines from "Step to My Girl". One of the members of Vampire Weekend also spoke directly to Souls of Mischief about the song's sample.

When Souls of Mischief member Tajai finally heard "Step" after it was completed, he expressed his approval stating that "it was so good; I was just happy we were able to be part of that." Impressed with the song's outcome, Souls of Mischief are contemplating on doing a collaboration with Vampire Weekend.

The Souls of Mischief's song ,"Step to My Girl", samples Grover Washington Jr.'s saxophone cover of Bread's 1973 single, "Aubrey". This is why David Gates, founder of Bread and songwriter of "Aubrey", is credited as a songwriter of "Step".

Release
"Step" was initially released as a double A-side single with "Diane Young" on March 18, 2013, with both songs being promoted as the lead singles taken from the band's third studio album Modern Vampires of the City. "Step" premiered with "Diane Young" on Zane Lowe's BBC Radio 1 show in the UK.

Remix
Vampire Weekend composed a remix of "Step", featuring guest verses from American rappers Danny Brown, Heems and Despot. The remix was released December 31, 2013.

Commercial performance
"Step" peaked at number 35 on the Billboard Alternative Songs chart. The single also reached number 170 in France. It also peaked at number 54 on the Ultratip charts in the Flanders region of Belgium.

Music video
The lyric video to "Step" was uploaded on March 18, 2013 on YouTube and VEVO. The background of the video shows various shots of New York City with the lyrics being shown over the top.

Personnel
Vampire Weekend
 Chris Baio – bass
 Rostam Batmanglij – piano, guitars, banjo, vocal harmonies and backing vocals, drum and synth programming, keyboards, shaker
 Ezra Koenig – lead vocals
 Chris Tomson – drums

Technical
 Rich Costey – mixing
 Chris Kasych – mix assistance, Pro Tools engineering
 Eric Isip – assistance
 Emily Lazar – mastering
 Joe LaPorta – mastering

Charts

Certifications

Notes

References

2014 singles
2013 songs
XL Recordings singles
Songs written by Ariel Rechtshaid
Vampire Weekend songs
Songs written by Rostam Batmanglij
Song recordings produced by Ariel Rechtshaid
Songs written by David Gates